Diallus is a genus of longhorn beetles of the subfamily Lamiinae, containing the following species:

subgenus Diallus
 Diallus gebehensis Breuning, 1957
 Diallus guttatus Pascoe, 1885
 Diallus lachrymosus Pascoe, 1866
 Diallus lugens Pascoe, 1866
 Diallus multiguttatus Breuning, 1947
 Diallus papuensis Breuning, 1960
 Diallus subtinctus Pascoe, 1866

subgenus Trichodiallus
 Diallus papuanus Breuning, 1947
 Diallus quadrimaculatus Breuning, 1942

References

Lamiini